The following lists events that happened during 1946 in Australia.

Incumbents

Monarch – George VI
Governor-General – Prince Henry, Duke of Gloucester
Prime Minister – Ben Chifley
Chief Justice – Sir John Latham

State Premiers
Premier of New South Wales – William McKell
Premier of Queensland – Frank Cooper (until 7 March), then Ned Hanlon
Premier of South Australia – Thomas Playford IV
Premier of Tasmania – Robert Cosgrove
Premier of Victoria – John Cain
Premier of Western Australia – Frank Wise

State Governors
Governor of New South Wales – Sir John Northcott (from 1 August)
Governor of Queensland – Sir Leslie Orme Wilson (until 23 April), then Sir John Lavarack (from 1 October)
Governor of South Australia – Sir Charles Norrie
Governor of Tasmania – Sir Hugh Binney
Governor of Victoria – Sir Winston Dugan
Governor of Western Australia – none appointed

Events
 26 January – Foundation Day is renamed Australia Day.
 18 February – The Archbishop of Sydney, Dr. Norman Gilroy, becomes Cardinal Gilroy, the first Australian born member of the College of Cardinals
 10 March – An Australian National Airways DC-3 aircraft crashes near Hobart, killing 25 people.
 1 May – At least 800 Aboriginal pastoral workers walk off the job in Northwest Western Australia, starting one of the longest industrial strikes in Australia.
 6 June – The ABC makes the first national broadcast of a federal parliamentary debate.
 19 July – Orange, New South Wales is proclaimed a city.
 30 August – Lismore, New South Wales is proclaimed a city.
 9 September – Trans Australia Airlines makes its first flight.
 28 September – A federal election is held. The Australian Labor Party and Prime Minister Ben Chifley are returned to power. A three-question referendum is also held: the question on Social Services is carried; questions on Marketing and Industrial Employment are not.
 23 November – A general election is held in Tasmania. The Labor Party led by Robert Cosgrove is returned to power with a reduced majority.
 13 December – The United Nations grants Australia trusteeship of Territory of New Guinea and Territory of Papua.

Science and technology
7 August – Overseas Telecommunications Commission established by an Act of Parliament in August 1946. It inherited facilities and resources from Amalgamated Wireless Australasia Limited (AWA) and Cable & Wireless, and was charged with responsibility for all international telecommunications services into, through and out of Australia.

Arts and literature

 William Dargie wins the Archibald Prize with his portrait of L. C. Robson

Film
 The Overlanders is released, starring Chips Rafferty

Politics
 establishment of the Western Australian Women’s Parliament

Sport
 14 September – Balmain win the 1946 NSWRFL season, defeating St. George 13–12 in the grand final. South Sydney, after not winning a game all season, finish in last place, claiming the wooden spoon for the second year in a row.
 Morna takes line honours and Christina wins on handicap in the Sydney to Hobart Yacht Race
 Russia wins the Melbourne Cup
 New Zealand defeats Australia 2–0 in a Rugby union test

Births
 29 January – Ian Meldrum, music personality
 8 February – Bob Collins, politician (died 2007)
 24 February – Bob Pearce, politician
 3 March – Tim Fischer, politician (died 2019)
 4 April – Colin Coates, ice speed skater
 10 April – Anne Boyd, composer
 17 April – Kerry O'Brien, middle-distance runner
 23 May – David Graham, golfer
 3 June – Tristan Rogers, Australian-American actor
 9 July – Bon Scott, singer (died 1980)
 1 August – Fiona Stanley, epidemiologist
 15 August – Victor Salvemini, Paralympic athlete (died 2020)
 1 September – Barry Gibb, musician-songwriter (Bee Gees)
 16 September – Mike Reynolds, Qld Parliament Speaker
 18 October – Penelope Wensley, Governor of Queensland (2008–2014)
 28 October – John Hewson, politician
30 October – Doug Parkinson, singer (died 2021)
 2 November – Alan Jones, racing driver
 20 December – John Bertrand, yachtsman

Deaths
 2 January – Joe Darling, cricketer (b. 1870)
 12 February – Sir David Gordon, South Australian politician (d. 1946)
 20 March – Ethel Richardson, author (died in the United Kingdom) (b. 1870)
 27 March – Sir Robert Best, Victorian politician and lawyer (b. 1856)
 13 September – William Watt, 24th Premier of Victoria (b. 1871)

See also
 List of Australian films of the 1940s

References

 
Australia
Years of the 20th century in Australia